was a Japanese diplomat.

Biography
Oshima was the recipient of a law degree from the University of Tokyo before joining the Ministry of Foreign Affairs in 1967. He served as the United Nations Under-Secretary-General for Humanitarian Affairs from 2001 to 2003, and was also Japan's Permanent Representative to the United Nations from 2004 to 2007. 

Before his appointment as Ambassador to the UN, he was the Ambassador of Japan to Australia from September 2003 to December 2004. In mid-January 2001, Secretary-General Kofi Annan appointed him head of the Office for the Coordination of Humanitarian Affairs.  Prior to this, he was Secretary-General of the Secretariat for International Peace Cooperation Headquarters in the Office of the Prime Minister of Japan, where he oversaw Japan's peacekeeping and humanitarian assistance program. During his early diplomatic career he was posted abroad to France, India, Australia, and the Permanent Mission of Japan to the United Nations headquarters in New York City.

On a personal level, Oshima took the issue of Chernobyl to heart, being a Hiroshima survivor. In his capacity as United Nations Coordinator of International Cooperation on Chernobyl, he launched the report The Human Consequences of the Chernobyl Nuclear Accident: A Strategy for Recovery.

He was married and had two children.

Oshima died of a heart attack on May 29, 2021, at the age of 78.

References

External links
 Resume from the UN Mission of Japan
 UN press release on his appointment, 6 December 2000
 http://www.un.org/webcast/ga/61/pdfs/japan-e.pdf
 

1943 births
2021 deaths
People from Hiroshima
Hibakusha
Ambassadors of Japan to Australia
Permanent Representatives of Japan to the United Nations
Under-Secretaries-General of the United Nations
Japanese officials of the United Nations